Bonte is a surname. Notable people with this surname include:

 Bert La Bonté, Australian actor
 Bob Bonte (1929–1988), Dutch swimmer
 Friedrich Bonte (1896–1940), German naval officer
 Hans Bonte (born 1962), Belgian politician
 John Harmon Charles Bonté (1831–1896), American lawyer and episcopal priest
 Marc de Bonte (1990–2016), Belgian kickboxer
 Paula Bonte (1840-1902), German landscape painter

See also
 Louis Bontes (born 1956), Dutch politician and former police officer